Mary J. Hickman is Professorial Research Fellow at St Mary's University, Twickenham. She was formerly a Professor of Irish Studies and Sociology at London Metropolitan University and director of its Institute for the Study of European Transformations. She was a member of the Irish Governments Task Force on Policy Regarding Emigrants (2001-2002). She has been Visiting Professor at: New York University, Columbia University and Victoria University, Melbourne. Her current research interests centre on migrations and diasporas. She has been a key figure in the documentation of The Irish Diaspora.

An important analysis of nineteenth-century attitudes by Mary J. Hickman and Bronwen Walter showed that the 'Irish Catholic' was one viewed as an "other" or a different race in the construction of the British nationalist myth.

Books
 Thinking Identities: Ethnicity, Racism and Culture - This book brings together research about a diverse range of groups who are rarely analyzed together: Welsh, Irish, Jewish, Arab, White, African and Indian.
Feminist Review; Issue 50 the Irish Issue By Mary J. Hickman, Ailbhe Smyth

References

Year of birth missing (living people)
Living people
Irish scholars and academics
Academics of London Metropolitan University
New York University staff
Columbia University staff
Academics of St Mary's University, Twickenham